Pichaqani (Aymara for "the one with a big needle", also spelled Pichacane, Pichacani) may refer to:

 Pichaqani (Arequipa), a mountain in the Arequipa Region, Peru
 Pichaqani (Bolivia), a mountain in the Inquisivi Province, La Paz Department, Bolivia
 Pichaqani (Cusco), a mountain in the Cusco Region, Peru
 Pichaqani (Loayza), a mountain in the Loayza Province, La Paz Department, Bolivia
 Pichaqani (Oruro), a mountain in the Challapata Province, Oruro Department, Bolivia
 Pichaqani (Puno), a mountain in the Puno Region, Peru
 Pichaqani (Quillacollo-Tapacarí), a mountain on the border of the Quillacollo Province and the Tapacarí Province, Cochabamba Department, Bolivia
 Pichaqani (Sajama), a mountain in the Sajama Province, Oruro Department, Bolivia
 Pichaqani (Vinto), a mountain in the Vinto Municipality, Quillacollo Province, Cochabamba Department, Bolivia
 Pichacani District, a district in Peru and its seat